Australian NetGuide was originally established in Australia by OzEmail as that Internet service provider's member publication.

History and profile
Australian NetGuide was started by New Zealand-based company Industrial Press in 1998. It was transformed into an A5 magazine targeting home internet users. Australian and New Zealand NetGuide magazine were sold to Australian Consolidated Press in 2003. The magazine ceased publication in 2009, merging with PC User (now TechLife). NetGuides last issue appeared on 8 July 2009 and its final editor was Gail Lipscombe.

In 2004 the circulation of Australian NetGuide was 43,600 copies. It was 16,047 copies just before its closure.

References

External links
Australian Net Guide Official Site

1998 establishments in Australia
2009 disestablishments in Australia
ACP magazine titles
Computer magazines published in Australia
Defunct computer magazines
Defunct magazines published in Australia
Magazines established in 1998
Magazines disestablished in 2009